Olivier Jäckle (born 7 July 1993) is a Swiss footballer who currently plays for FC Aarau in the Challenge League as a central midfielder.

External links
 
 

1993 births
Living people
Swiss men's footballers
Switzerland under-21 international footballers
Swiss Super League players
Swiss Challenge League players
FC Aarau players
Association football midfielders